Brandon Makkole DeShazer (born January 2, 1984 in Racine, Wisconsin) is an American actor and former model.

Biography

Early life
DeShazer was born in Racine, Wisconsin to singer Bruce DeShazer i.e. Tony Christian guitarist of Prince protege group Mazarati (1986) of The Wild Pair and mother Brenda Buchanan. He is of African American and French-Creole and Native American descent. He grew up in Milwaukee, Wisconsin and attended Marquette University.

Career

Acting career

At the age of 7, DeShazer was offered his first television role on a developing kids show on PBS called Get Real!. DeShazer remained on the show for two seasons before working as a catalogue model for department stores like Target, Mervyns, and Kohl's. DeShazer took to stage acting in high school where he attended Wauwatosa West High School in Wisconsin. Landing leading roles such as the controversial Emcee in Cabaret, Brandon was recognized for his abilities at the 2000-2001 Ilium Awards in which he was awarded Best Actor and Best Dancer. Around the same time Brandon was offered his first feature film role in Virginia Jack (Sundance), where he played a pompous car technician named Rich. As the roles kept presenting themselves, Brandon found himself working with "A" class actors such a Bernie Mac and Angela Bassett in Mr. 3000 (Touchstone/Disney) in which he plays a reporter turned #1 fan. Since then, he also has found himself working with Jennifer Aniston and Clive Owen in DERAILED, and Queen Latifah and Will Ferrell in the comedy Stranger than Fiction. DeShazer's has appeared in independent dramas, "Thacker Case" and "Diary of a Champion."

Career in modeling
DeShazer began modeling at a young age, appearing first in catalogues as a child. In 2002, the then 17-year-old signed with Arlene Wilson's Modeling Agency. DeShazer has since worked with the top modeling agencies Ford Models Management, AW Management, Wehmann Modeling Agency and is currently signed with Ford Models in Los Angeles. He has appeared in numerous advertisements, including McDonald's, Zegna, Deisel, and Saks Fifth Avenue as well as gracing the pages of top magazines Sports Illustrated, People, Entertainment Weekly, and In Touch Weekly.

DeShazer now resides in Los Angeles, California.

Filmography
 Friends & Lovers
 Shifter (2008)
 The Thacker Case (2008) -O'Brien
 Surfer, Dude (2008)
 Producing The Hood (2007) - Derek
 Double Pleasure, Double Pain (2006) - Doug
 BloodBound (2006) - Hugh
 Stranger than Fiction (2006)
 Mr. 3000 (2003) – Press Box Reporter
 Virginia Jack (2002) – Rich

Television
 Days of Our Lives (2008)
 Dirt (2007)
 Prison Break (2005)
 1/4life (2004)
 Get Real! (1991) - Co-host
 "Real Housewives of Atlanta" (2012)
 "Real Housewives of Atlanta" (2013)
 "Real Housewives of Atlanta" (2014)
 "Real Housewives of Atlanta" (2015)

Music videos
 Eve's "Tambourine"
 Jennifer Lopez's "Doin it Well"

References

External links

1984 births
Living people
American male film actors
American male television actors
Male models from Wisconsin
African-American male actors
American people of Creole descent
Male actors from Milwaukee
People from Racine, Wisconsin
Marquette University alumni
21st-century African-American people
20th-century African-American people